Daniel Betts Jr. (May 2, 1699 – Jul. 10, 1783) was a member of the Connecticut House of Representatives from Norwalk in 1777.

He was born May 2, 1699 in Norwalk, the son of Daniel Betts and Deborah Taylor Betts.

In 1774, he served on a committee appointed in Norwalk to address the 11th article adopted by the Continental Congress.

References 

1699 births
1783 deaths
Members of the Connecticut House of Representatives
Politicians from Norwalk, Connecticut